Băxani is a village in Soroca District, Moldova. Between the village of Băxani and Popești is located a natural reservation - the Băxani Forest. The forest has a surface of 45 hectares and is administered by the Soroca Forestry Farm (Ro: Gospodăria Silvică de Stat Soroca).

Notable people
 Emanuil Gavriliță

References

Villages of Soroca District